Hornschuchia is a genus of flowering plants in the custard apple and soursop family Annonaceae, with all species native to South America and in eastern Brazil. It is within the Bocageeae tribe.

The genus name of Hornschuchia is in honour of Christian Friedrich Hornschuch (1793–1850), a German botanist born in Bavaria.
It was first described and published in Flora Vol.4 on page 302 in 1821.

Species
According to Kew;

Hornschuchia bryotrophe  is the type species.

References

Annonaceae genera
Annonaceae
Plants described in 1821
Flora of Brazil